Cyon may refer to:

Cyon (wrestler) (Robert Anthony, born 1982), or Egotistico Fantastico, an American professional wrestler
Elias von Cyon or Elie de Cyon (Ilya Fadeyevich Tsion, 1843–1912), Russian-French physiologist 
LG Cyon, a Korean cellphone brand
"-cyon", a commonly used taxonomic affixe
Catholic Youth Organization Nigeria

See also